Heidelberg-Königstuhl State Observatory is a historic astronomical observatory located near the summit of the Königstuhl hill in the city of Heidelberg in Germany. The predecessor of the current observatory was originally opened in 1774 in the nearby city of Mannheim but degradation of observational conditions there resulted in a relocation to the Königstuhl in 1898.

The observatory forms part of the Center of Astronomy of the University of Heidelberg. The Max Planck Institute for Astronomy opened on an adjacent site in 1967. Prof. Dr. Andreas Quirrenbach is the observatory's director since 2005.

History 

The instrumentation of the observatory originated from the Mannheim Observatory, founded in 1774. In 1880 the observatory was provisionally moved to Karlsruhe because the astronomical/atmospherical seeing conditions worsened. In subsequent years, three other locations were considered, with Heidelberg-Königstuhl finally being chosen.

On 20 June 1898 the "Großherzogliche Bergsternwarte" was ceremonially inaugurated by Frederick I, Grand Duke of Baden. The astronomical institute comprised two complementary departments, the astrophysical, led by Max Wolf, and the astrometrical led by Karl Wilhelm Valentiner. Valentiner was director of the Mannheim observatory and initiated the move to Karlsruhe. After Valentiner's retirement in 1909, both departments were placed under the administration of Max Wolf.

While the new observatory complex was still under construction Max Wolf obtained a grant of $10,000 from the American philanthropist Catherine Wolfe Bruce for the acquisition of a powerful new dual  refractor telescope, the Bruce double astrograph. For many years this telescope was the observatory's main research instrument. He later obtained a grant to build the observatory's a  reflector telescope, the observatory's first.

The main field of activity of the observatory was the investigation of nebulae and the search for asteroids. Wolf, his staff and his successors discovered over 800 asteroids, including the first trojan asteroid Achilles in 1906.

The observatory ceased to be run by the German federal government in 2005 when it was joined with the Institute of Theoretical Astrophysics and Astronomical Calculation Institute to make up the Center of Astronomy of the University of Heidelberg.

Between 1912 and 1957 Karl Wilhelm Reinmuth discovered almost 400 asteroids from the Heidelberg-Königstuhl State Observatory.

See also 
 List of astronomical observatories

References

External links 
 Official observatory website (German/English)

Astronomical observatories in Germany
Heidelberg University
Astronomy institutes and departments
Buildings and structures in Heidelberg